Samuel James Pearce (born 2 September 1997) is a Welsh cricketer. He made his first-class debut on 1 April 2018 for Cardiff MCCU against Gloucestershire as part of the Marylebone Cricket Club University fixtures. He made his Twenty20 debut on 29 June 2021, for Glamorgan in the 2021 T20 Blast.

References

External links
 

1997 births
Living people
Welsh cricketers
Wales National County cricketers
Cardiff MCCU cricketers
Glamorgan cricketers